Barnwell railway station is a former railway station in Barnwell, Northamptonshire on the former Northampton and Peterborough Railway line which connected Peterborough and Northampton.

The station buildings were designed by the architect John William Livock.

In 1846 the line, along with the London and Birmingham, became part of the London and North Western Railway. At grouping in 1923 it became part of the London Midland and Scottish Railway.

Gallery

The former service 
The service was from Peterborough to Northampton via Wellingborough. The station opened in 1845 and closed in 1964 to passengers. The stationmaster's house still stands as a private residence.

The wooden waiting room on the platform was moved from Barnwell to Wansford station on the preserved Nene Valley Railway on 5 April 1977. The building is of typical LNWR wooden construction. It was originally built in 1884 for use by members of the Royal family when visiting Barnwell Manor, home of the Duke of Buccleuch.

References

External links
 Barnwell station on Subterranea Britannica

Disused railway stations in Northamptonshire
Former London and Birmingham Railway stations
Railway stations in Great Britain opened in 1845
Railway stations in Great Britain closed in 1964
Beeching closures in England
John William Livock buildings
North Northamptonshire